Bread Ahead is a chain of bakeries that also provide baking classes in London, England. It was founded in 2013 by Matthew Jones in London's Borough Market. Under Jones' guidance as founder and head baker, it has specialised in doughnuts, using British sourced ingredients from traders in Borough Market and Chelmsford in Essex. It also sells sourdough breads, cakes, pizza, coffees and pastries.

Locations 
As of October 2022, there are six outlets in London, one in Saudi Arabia. During the months between September 2021 and February 2022 Bread Ahead had a temporary residency at the Southwark Cathedral Cafe

Baking school 
In 2014, Bread Ahead set up a bakery school to teach customers. and breads. During the lockdown in 2019/20 they moved the baking classes online. The live baking workshops ran every day at 2pm on their Instagram account, where viewers could tune in for a live baking lesson

References

External links
 Official website

Bakery cafés
Restaurant franchises
Restaurant chains in the United Kingdom
British companies established in 2013
Retail companies established in 2013
Restaurants established in 2013
Bakeries of the United Kingdom
Companies based in the London Borough of Southwark
Food manufacturers based in London
Privately held companies based in London
Doughnut shops
2013 establishments in England